The 2004 Broadland District Council election took place on 10 June 2004 to elect members of Broadland District Council in England. This was on the same day as other local elections.

The whole council was up for election on new ward boundaries.

Election result

|}

References

2004 English local elections
June 2004 events in the United Kingdom
2004
2000s in Norfolk